The Alliance of Independent Democrats in Europe (AIDE) (Alliance des Démocrates Indépendants en Europe (ADIE) in French) was a Eurosceptic, nationalist political party at the European level.

Creation
AIDE was created on 28 October 2005 in the Rhône prefecture. Its stated purpose was "to gather political movements, and elected members of the national and regional assemblies of the Member States of the European Union, that adhere to the policy defined in its charter."

Position
AIDE described itself as the centre-right faction of the eurosceptic IND/DEM group, with the EUDemocrats, the United Kingdom Independence Party and the European Christian Political Movement comprising the other factions of that group.

Website
As of January 2007, the group operated a limited French-language website.
The group's website implied the existence of British, Czech, French, Greek, Irish, Italian and Polish delegations and identified Movement for France (MpF) MEP Patrick Louis as the president of AIDE. By February 2009, the ADIE website had devolved from providing original content to simply redisplaying feeds from the www.observatoiredeleurope.com website associated with the Independence/Democracy group

Membership
In light of the defection of Lega Nord (Italy) to UEN, it was believed that the members of AIDE  were as follows:

 Independent Democrats

 Movement for France

 Popular Orthodox Rally

 Urszula Krupa MEP and Witold Tomczak MEP (an apparent faction of the League of Polish Families)

 Jim Allister MEP (a Non Attached MEP from the Traditional Unionist Voice, formerly representing the Democratic Unionist Party and then an independent).

Dissolution
AIDE was dissolved with effect from 31 December 2008 and was defunded in the February 2009 meeting of the Bureau of the European Parliament.

References

Eurosceptic parties
Political parties established in 2005
Pan-European political parties
2005 establishments in the European Union